Engberg Bluff is a bold ice-covered bluff between the mouths of Argonaut Glacier and Meander Glacier at the point where these tributaries enter the south part of Mariner Glacier, in Victoria Land. It was mapped by the United States Geological Survey from surveys and U.S. Navy air photos, 1960–64, and was named by the Advisory Committee on Antarctic Names for Larry W. Engberg, a meteorologist at Hallett Station, 1961.

References 

Cliffs of Victoria Land
Borchgrevink Coast